Vishal Yadav (born 14 December 1967) is an Indian former cricketer. He played first-class cricket for Bengal and Uttar Pradesh.

See also
 List of Bengal cricketers

References

External links
 

1967 births
Living people
Indian cricketers
Bengal cricketers
Uttar Pradesh cricketers
People from Faridabad
Cricketers from Haryana